Osmodes banghaasii, Bang-Haas' white-spots, is a butterfly in the family Hesperiidae. It is found in Ghana, the Republic of the Congo, the Central African Republic and north-western Tanzania. The habitat consists of wetter forests.
The name honours the Danish entomologist Andreas Bang-Haas.

References

Butterflies described in 1896
Erionotini
Butterflies of Africa